Elica is a monotypic genus of planthoppers containing the species Elica latipennis from Peninsular Malaysia.

Taxonomy
Elica latipennis is placed in the family Tropiduchidae and was erected by Francis Walker in 1857.  It is the type species in its genus, the subfamily Elicinae and tribe Elicini, according to Fulgoromorpha Lists on the Web.

Description
Walker's original description for E. latipennis states that:
 "Head conical, slightly ascending, with three ridges above; front lanceolate, tetragonal, with three ridges, the lateral pair curved, margins also ridged. Antennæ conical; bristle about twice the length of the preceding part. Prothorax very short. Mesothorax with three keels. Fore wings broad, with numerous transverse veinlets along the costa; discal areolets elongate towards the base of the wing; those exterior more numerous, short and generally hexagonal or pentagonal."

References

External links

 Illustration of wing veination: ResearchGate.

Elicini
Hemiptera of Asia